Loch Tarsan; is a freshwater loch and impounding reservoir located 13 kilometres Northwest of Dunoon, on the Cowal peninsula in Argyll and Bute, Scotland.  This three-armed Reservoir extends into both Glen Tarsan and Glen Lean. It supplies water to the Striven Hydro-Electric Scheme (also known as the Cowal Hydro-Electric Power Scheme). The larger of the two dams is 17.6 metres high and was completed in 1953.  The water that is collected in the loch, are piped to the hydro-electric generating station, located at Ardtaraig, at the head of Loch Striven.

The lochs angling is managed by Dunoon and District Angling Club.

The B836 road passes the loch.

See also

 List of reservoirs and dams in the United Kingdom

References

Sources

 "Argyll and Bute Council Reservoirs Act 1975 Public Register"
 Scottish Places - Cowal Hydro-Electric Power Scheme

External links

 Dunoon and District Angling Club, Loch Tarsan page - website

Tarsan
Cowal